Brian Battese (born 25 March 1961) is an Australian former professional rugby league footballer who played as a second-row forward in the 1980s. He played in the Brisbane Rugby League and New South Wales Rugby League premierships.

Playing career
A South Lismore junior, Battese played with Wynnum-Manly Seagulls in the Brisbane Rugby League Premiership. He played in Wynnum-Manly's 1982 Grand Final victory over Souths before moving to Sydney club, Western Suburbs Magpies, in 1983. After one season with the club, he moved to Canterbury-Bankstown Bulldogs for two seasons under coach Warren Ryan. Although Battese started the 1984 season in reserve-grade, in April he replaced the injured Phil Gould and retained the position for the remainder of the year and played in the premiership winning team against Parramatta. In 1985, Battese was a member of the victorious Canterbury team that defeated St. George in the grand final.

Battese spent the 1985–1986 off-season with Salford City in England before returning to Australia to join Eastern Suburbs. After a move to the A.C.T. in 1988, Battese played only two matches for the Canberra Raiders before retiring.

Post playing
Battese now teaches at St. John's College in Lismore and coaches junior rugby league.

Footnotes

References

External links
Bulldogs profile
Brian Battese at NRL Stats

1961 births
Australian rugby league players
Wynnum Manly Seagulls players
Western Suburbs Magpies players
Sydney Roosters players
Salford Red Devils players
Canterbury-Bankstown Bulldogs players
Canberra Raiders players
Living people
Rugby league second-rows
Rugby league players from New South Wales